The California Massage Therapy Council (CAMTC) is a nonprofit organisation charged with oversight of California's massage businesses. It comprises representatives from the massage industry.

History
The state of California transferred oversight of the industry To the CAMTC. Previously, regulation and oversight had come from municipal authorities. Since that change, many cities have experienced a boom in the number of massage establishments. The CAMTC has proposed legislation, in 2013, to help cities combat prostitution, which is often perceived as associated with massage studios. A proposed bill, announced April 2014, would change the body to include representatives from the  League of California Cities, the California State Association of Counties, and the California Police Chiefs Association. This action would effectively return more local control to the regulation of the industry.

CAMTC Approved Massage Schools

 A2Z Health.net, Inc
 Abrams College
 American Career College
 American Institute of Massage Therapy
 Bellus Academy
 Blake Austin College
 Brightwood College
 Burke Williams Academy of Massage Therapy
 California College of Physical Arts, Inc
 California Healing Arts College
 California Holistic Institute
 California Institute of Massage & Spa Services
 Calistoga Massage Therapy School
 Career Networks Institute (CNI College)
 Carrington College
 Cerritos College Community Education
 CES College
 Charter College
 Cinta Aveda
 De Anza College
 Diamond Light School of Massage and Healing Arts
 Downey Adult School
 Esalen Institute
 Five Branches University
 Fremont College
 Fullerton College
 Hands On Healing Institute
 Healing Hands School of Holistic Health
 Healing Oak School of Massage
 Holistic Life Institute
 Institute for Business and Technology
 International College of Holistic Studies
 International Professional School of Bodywork
 Kali Institute for Massage & Somatic Therapies
 Life Energy Institute
 Loving Hands Institute of Healing Arts
 Massage Center
 Massage Therapy Institute
 Mayfield College
 McKinnon Body Therapy Center
 Milan Institute
 MiraCosta College
 Monterey Institute of Touch
 Monterey Peninsula College
 National Holistic Institute
 Pacific College of Oriental Medicine
 Palace Beauty College
 Rosemead Beauty School
 Sacramento Holistic Health Academy
 San Francisco School of Massage & Bodywork
 Santa Barbara Body Therapy Institute
 School of Holistic Touch
 Sierra Massage School
 Skyline College
 Somatherapy Institute School of Massage
 South Bay Massage College
 Southern California Health Institute
 Southern California University of Health Sciences
 Victory Career College

References

External links
CAMTC Website

Economy of California
Massage therapy
Non-profit organizations based in California